Doyle Cofer (January 18, 1923 – January 15, 1999) was an American professional basketball player. He played in the National Basketball League for the Detroit Vagabond Kings during the 1948–49 season and averaged 3.4 points per game. 

He spent one season as a member of the Indiana State Sycamores.  In his lone season, the Sycamores reached the finals of the 1946 NAIA Division I men's basketball tournament, they were led by Glenn Curtis.

A civil engineer after basketball, Cofer was killed at age 75 in an accident when he was trying to load a bulldozer onto a flatbed. The bulldozer toppled over and crushed him.

References 

1923 births
1999 deaths
American men's basketball players
United States Marine Corps personnel of World War II
Basketball players from Indiana
Detroit Vagabond Kings players
Forwards (basketball)
Indiana State Sycamores men's basketball players
People from Knox County, Indiana
Military personnel from Indiana
Accidental deaths in Indiana